The islands of Samoa were originally inhabited by humans as early as 850 BC. After being invaded by European explorers in the 18th century, by the 20th and 21st century, the islands were incorporated into Samoa (Western Samoa, Independent Samoa) and American Samoa (Eastern Samoa).

Early history of the Polynesian people of Samoa
The pre-colonial history of Eastern Samoa (now American Samoa) is inextricably bound with the history of Western Samoa (now independent Samoa).

The Tui Manu'a is one of the oldest Samoan titles in Samoa. Traditional oral literature of Samoa and Manu'a talks of a widespread Polynesian network or confederacy (or "empire") that was prehistorically ruled by the successive Tui Manu'a dynasties. Manuan genealogies and religious oral literature also suggest that the Tui Manu'a had long been one of the most prestigious and powerful paramounts Samoa. Legends suggest that the Tui Manu'a kings ruled a confederacy of far-flung islands which included Fiji, Tonga as well as smaller western Pacific chiefdoms and Polynesian outliers such as Uvea, Futuna, Tokelau, and Tuvalu. Commerce and exchange routes between the western Polynesian societies is well documented and it is speculated that the Tui Manu'a dynasty grew through its success in obtaining control over the oceanic trade of currency goods such as finely woven ceremonial mats, whale ivory "tabua", obsidian and basalt tools, chiefly red feathers, and seashells reserved for royalty (such as polished nautilus and the egg cowry).

The islands of Upolu and Savai'i were politically connected to 'Upolu island in what is now independent Samoa. It can be said that all the Samoa islands are politically connected today through the faamatai chiefly system and through family connections that are as strong as ever. This system of the faamatai and the customs of faasamoa originated with two of the most famous early chiefs of Samoa, who were both women and related, Nafanua and Salamasina.

Arrival of Western missionaries
Early Western contact included a battle in the 18th century between French explorers and islanders in Tutuila, for which the Samoans were blamed in the West, giving them a reputation for ferocity. Early 19th-century Rarotongan missionaries to the Samoa islands were followed by a group of Western missionaries led by John Williams of the (Congregationalist) London Missionary Society in the 1830s, officially bringing Christianity to Samoa. Less than a hundred years later, the Samoan Congregationalist Church became the first independent indigenous church of the South Pacific.

European and American Colonial Division of the Samoan archipelago
In 1872 the high chief of the tribes of the eastern Samoan islands gave America permission to establish a naval base in exchange for military protection. In 1878 the U.S. Navy built a coaling station on Pago Pago Bay for its Pacific Squadron and appointed a local Secretary. American Samoa is the result of the Second Samoan Civil War and an agreement made between Germany, the United States, and the United Kingdom in the Tripartite Convention of 1899. The international rivalries were settled by the 1899 Treaty of Berlin in which Germany and the U.S. divided the Samoan archipelago. The eastern Samoan islands became territories of the United States and later became known as American Samoa. The U.S. formally occupied its portion, with the noted harbor of Pago Pago, the following year. The western islands are now the independent state of Samoa.

Colonization by the United States
Several chiefs of the island of Tutuila swore allegiance, and ceded the island, to the United States in the Treaty of Cession of Tutuila of 1900. The last sovereign of Manuʻa, the Tui Manuʻa Elisara, signed the Treaty of Cession of Manuʻa of 1904 following a series of US Naval trials, known as the "Trial of the Ipu", in Pago Pago, Taʻu, and aboard a Pacific Squadron gunboat. The treaties were ratified by the United States in the Ratification Act of 1929.

After World War I, during the time of the Mau movement in Western Samoa (then a New Zealand protectorate), there was a corresponding American Samoa Mau movement, led by Samuel Sailele Ripley, who was from Leone village and was a World War I war veteran. In 1921, seventeen chiefs of the American Samoa Mau were arrested and imprisoned under hard labor.

During World War II, U.S. Marines in American Samoa outnumbered the local population, having a huge cultural influence. Young Samoan men from the age of 14 and above were combat trained by US military personnel. As in World War I, American Samoans served in World War II as combatants, medical personnel, code personnel, ship repairs, etc.

Current status of the territory and attempts of incorporation in the United States
After the war, Organic Act 4500, a U.S. Department of Interior-sponsored attempt to incorporate American Samoa, was defeated in Congress, primarily through the efforts of American Samoan chiefs, led by Tuiasosopo Mariota. These chiefs' efforts led to the creation of a local legislature, the American Samoa Fono which meets in the village of Fagatogo, the territory's capital.

In time, the Navy-appointed governor was replaced by a locally elected one. Although technically considered "unorganized" in that the U.S. Congress has not passed an Organic Act for the territory, American Samoa is self-governing under a constitution that became effective on July 1, 1967. The U.S. Territory of American Samoa is on the United Nations list of non-self-governing territories.

The islands have been reluctant to separate from the US in any manner. The maritime boundaries of American Samoa with New Zealand (Tokelau, the Cook Islands, and Niue) have been determined in a series of treaties.  Maritime boundaries with Tonga and Samoa have yet to be agreed upon.

Economy of American Samoa
Employment on the island basically falls into three relatively equally sized categories of approximately 5,000 workers each: the public sector, the tuna cannery, and the rest of the private sector. There are only a few federal employees in American Samoa and no active military personnel (there are several Army Reserve units including companies of the famed 100th Infantry Battalion; the overwhelming majority of public sector employees work for the American Samoa Government. The StarKist cannery exports several hundred million dollars worth of canned tuna to the United States.

See also
 Outline of American Samoa

References

Further reading
 Campbell, Charles S. The transformation of American foreign relations, 1865-1900  (1976) pp 72–83, 311–26.
 Gray, John Alexander Clinton. Amerika Samoa: A History of American Samoa and Its United States Naval Administration (United States Naval Institute, 1960).
 Huebner, Thorn. "Vernacular literacy, English as a language of wider communication, and language shift in American Samoa." Journal of Multilingual & Multicultural Development 7.5 (1986): 393–411.
 Kennedy, Paul. The Samoan Tangle: A Study in Anglo-German-American Relations 1878–1900 (1977).
 Pletcher, David M.  The Diplomacy of Involvement: American Economic Expansion across the Pacific, 1784-1900 (2001) online.
 Siebold, Dennis J. "Delaware and the Key to the Pacific: Thomas F. Bayard, George H. Bates, and the Acquisition of American Samoa, 1886--1899" Delaware History (2008) 32#2 pp 105–148.  online at Ebsco.

 
American Samoa
American Samoa